Lake Barrington can refer to:

Lake Barrington, Illinois, a village in the United States of America
Lake Barrington (Tasmania), Australia, a lake near Sheffield